Ludwig's Law is the one and only album released by trio of Dieter Moebius, Conny Plank, and Mayo Thompson.  It was actually the fourth album recorded by the team of Moebius & Plank.  In 1983 the duo recorded a series of electronic tracks using an Emulator, an early form of sampling keyboard that enabled them to duplicate other instruments without having to deal with the musicians who played them.  Mayo Thompson of Red Krayola recorded a series of monologues and vocal tracks which were added to the music Moebius & Plank had recorded.  According to the Earpiece website "topics include the fate of chickens owned by a 'farmer gabriel' and the effect of lack of sunlight on human intelligence." Sky Records, which had released the first three Moebius & Plank album, rejected the master and Ludwig's Law was relegated to the vault.  It was finally released on November 16, 1998 on the Drag City label.

Bill Meyer, who wrote the editorial review for Amazon.com, describes the album, in part: "The duo recorded a series of stately fanfares and brittle Talking Heads funk, over which Thompson narrated a series of skewed monologues about philosophy, art, history, and careless farmers."

Despite the rejection of Ludwig's Law by Sky, Moebius & Plank did decide to tour and perform the music, albeit without Mayo Thompson.  Conny Plank fell ill while touring in South America and finally succumbed to cancer in 1987.

Track listing
"Scientists" - 0:38
"Das Apartment" - 4:30
"The Truth?" - 5:14
"Ludwig's Law" - 4:20
"42" - 3:44
"Farmer Gabriel" - 4:51
"Gestalt" - 4:43
"Taras Bulba" - 5:06
"Boy Boy Boy" - 3:16

Personnel
Dieter Moebius 
Conny Plank 
Mayo Thompson - vocals

Notes

References 
 Album liner notes
 Amazon.com Ludwig's Law  Retrieved September 28, 2007.
 Drag City catalog Moebius Plank Thompson - Ludwig's Law  Retrieved September 28, 2007.
 Forced Exposure Moebius/Plank/Thompson  Retrieved September 28, 2007.
 Interlog Ludwig's Law description  Retrieved September 28, 2007.

External links
 Anonymous Random Writings on Music and Other Things: German Rock  Retrieved September 7, 2007.

1998 albums
Moebius & Plank albums
Albums produced by Conny Plank